38 Leonis Minoris is a binary star system in the northern constellation of Leo Minor. It shines with a combined light of apparent magnitude 5.84, which indicates it a dimly visible to the naked eye under good viewing conditions. An annual parallax shift of 19.11 mas provides a distance estimate of around 171 light years. It has a relatively high proper motion, traversing the celestial sphere at a rate of 0.226 arcseconds per year, and is moving away from the Sun with a radial velocity of +31 km/s.

This is a single-lined spectroscopic binary with an orbital period of 7.8 days and a low eccentricity of 0.023 – nearly circular. The visible component has a stellar classification of G0 IV, matching a G-type subgiant star that is exhausting the hydrogen at its core and evolving into a giant. It is about two billion years old with 1.68 times the mass of the Sun and is spinning with a projected rotational velocity of 14.5 km/s. The star has a higher than solar abundance of iron in its spectrum. It is radiating 11 times the Sun's luminosity from its photosphere at an effective temperature of 6,106 K.

References

G-type subgiants
Spectroscopic binaries
Leonis Minoris, 38
Leo Minor
Durchmusterung objects
092168
052139
4168